Adoration of the Magi is a 1530s oil on panel painting by the Italian renaissance artist Benvenuto Tisi in the collection of the Rijksmuseum.

Painting
Mary sits with her child in front of ruined columns receiving gifts in a fantasy landscape. On the right a man points to the Star of Bethlehem.

Exhibitions

This painting has been considered a highlight of the collection since it was acquired in 1823 by William I of the Netherlands from the estate of Edmund Bourke in Paris and given to the Trippenhuis museum. It has been included in all Highlights of the Rijksmuseum catalogs since.

References

 SK-A-114 painting record on museum website

1530s paintings
Italian paintings
Paintings in the collection of the Rijksmuseum
Garofalo
Paintings of the Madonna and Child